Scottish Young Liberals (formerly referred to as Liberal Youth Scotland or LYS) is the Youth and Student wing of the Scottish Liberal Democrats. Reformed from the Scottish Young Liberal Democrats in 2008 and Liberal Youth Scotland in 2017, the organisation has taken a prominent role in party conferences. Its membership is open to any member of the Liberal Democrats living, working or studying in Scotland and is either under 30 years of age or in full or part-time education above that age.

SYL has branches across Scotland including various Universities, and seeks to promote the work and campaigning of the party and SYL. It is also a part of the UK Federal Young Liberals. The current Chair Leo Dempster acting following the resignation of Jack Clark in January 2023.

Launch
In November 2008, an interim committee was elected including Tom Maidwell as President, Ruaraidh Dobson as Vice-President, Anna Rothwell as Treasurer and Ailsa McGregor as Secretary. This committee saw the group through its successful launch event at the Scottish Liberal Democrats Conference Spring 2009 in Perth. At this conference, LYS submitted two motions, one on the Minimum Income Guarantee for students, and one on investigating the ban on homosexual and bisexual men from giving blood, both of which were passed overwhelmingly. Also, Ruaraidh Dobson picked up the award for best speech at conference, for his summation of the Minimum Income Guarantee motion.

Structure

Current committee

Scottish Young Liberals is part of the federal structure of Young Liberals and its President is the Scottish Convenor of that organisation. Scottish Young Liberals is responsible for tailoring YL campaigns to match political circumstances in Scotland, and for developing indigenous campaigns that reflect the status of Scotland in the United Kingdom.

As of January 2023, the office bearers of the Scottish Young Liberals are as follows:

A representative from every Scottish Young Liberals branch is also entitled to sit on the Executive as a voting member.

As of 2011, SYL also elects an Honorary President and two Honorary Vice-Presidents who are members of the Scottish Liberal Democrats to serve as figureheads, and provide advice to the executive.

Scottish Young Liberals branches
All Liberal Democrat university societies within Scotland are affiliated to Young Liberals.

Glasgow University - President Alex Palmer (Glasgow University Liberal Democrats)
Edinburgh University - President Calum Fairbairn (Edinburgh Young Liberals)
Aberdeen University - Vacant (Aberdeen University Liberal Democrats)
University of St. Andrews - President Jamie Nicholas (University of St. Andrews Liberal Democrats)

International links

Scottish Young Liberals, through the UK Federal structure, is a member of two international youth organisations:
 The International Federation of Liberal Youth (IFLRY), which acts as the youth organisation of Liberal International.
 The European Liberal Youth (LYMEC), which acts as the youth organisation of the European Liberal Democrat and Reform Party.

Within the Scottish Liberal Democrats
Scottish Young Liberals is an Associated Organisation of the Scottish Liberal Democrats, with one seat on the Scottish Liberal Democrat National Executive Committee and one seat on each of the Party's other Standing Committees (Policy, Campaigns & Candidates, Finance and Membership and Conference Committees). This enables young members in the party the opportunities to fully engage in the decision making process. SYL also serves as an advisory body to the Scottish Liberal Democrats on a number of issues.

Activity

2009–2010
On 23 May 2009, Liberal Youth Scotland organised and staged a demonstration in support of Scott Rennie, the Christian minister called to be minister of Queen's Cross, Aberdeen, whose appointment was being challenged by a minority of the Aberdeen Presbytery who believed he should not take up the post on account of his homosexuality. The protest was staged outside the General Assembly Building of the Church of Scotland, where the assembly were debating whether or not to uphold the call from Queen's Cross Kirk and the Aberdeen Presbytery, and attracted around 80 demonstrators. At 10:34 pm, after four hours of debate, the assembly voted to uphold the call.

In late 2009, Liberal Youth Scotland and their federal counterparts campaigned against the Student Loans Company, the organisation who are responsible for allocating funding to students from England and Wales. The SLC failed to pay thousands of students, leaving University hardship funds depleted, and many students having no money to fund their studies. Liberal Youth Scotland held a protest outside the organisation's HQ in Glasgow, and succeeded in the campaign for resignations from some of the senior figures

At the Scottish Liberal Democrats conference in March 2010, LYS once again succeeded in changing the party's policy, this time to call for equal marriage rights for all couples. The organisation also picked up the Ray Michie prize for membership, for recruitment at Fresher's Weeks around the country.

2011–2012

In 2011 Liberal Youth Scotland campaigned for a review of sentencing for drug possession, and an amendment by LYS member and founder of 'Liberal Democrats for Drug Policy Reform' Ewan Hoyle ensured that specialist diamorphine treatment could be considered in the review.

In their manifesto for the 2011 election, the Scottish Liberal Democrats included many policies introduced by LYS: ending the gay blood ban, equal marriage rights, and the review of drug possession sentencing.

In late 2011 and early 2012 Liberal Youth Scotland led the fight for Equal Marriage through their 'Separate isn't Equal Campaign'. In September LYS and NUS Scotland protested outside John Mason MSP’s Constituency Office, to highlight the fearmongering nature of his motion which stated, "no person or organisation should be forced to be involved in or to approve of same-sex marriages".

NUS Scotland and LYS again teamed up alongside the Scottish Youth Parliament and the Equality Network to stage a march on the Scottish Parliament calling for Equal Marriage on Valentine's Day 2012. They were joined by over 1,000 people. As a result, the Scottish Government announced its intention to put the issue to parliament.

2012–2013

In 2012, Liberal Youth Scotland launched a number of member-led campaigns taking on a range of issues from Political Reform, Education, Housing, the Environment, Rural Affairs as well as maintaining the fight for Equal Marriage.

Liberal Youth Scotland, alongside NUS Scotland, the Scottish Youth Parliament and various other organisations, joined the call to bring Votes@16 to the referendum agreement. The campaign saw the introduction of a bill on Votes@16 to the Scottish Parliament as well as the overwhelming support of Stephen Williams MP's backbench motion on Votes@16 in the House of Commons.

Continuing to work with other organisations, Liberal Youth Scotland was the first party-political movement to take up Shelters Scotland’s call to campaign for the  a crackdown on illegal fees charged by letting agencies. Scottish Liberal Democrat Conference in late 2102 overwhelmingly supported the move to remove Accredited Landlord status from Landlords charging such fees, to implement mystery shopper checks on letting agencies to discover whether they charge illegal fees, and to allow backdating of claims for 10 years. The Scottish Government have since reaffirmed the illegality of these charges.

Additionally, at the same Conference Liberal Youth Scotland moved a motion in support of the introduction of Container-deposit legislation through 'Reverse Vending Machines', a return and deposit system to rapidly increase recycling. In response to the SNP Government's failure to meet climate change targets the Conference overwhelmingly backed the motion to introduce a proven system of recycling that has seen results of up to 90% across Europe. The Scottish Government, in early 2013, launched a £900,000 trial scheme across Scotland to examine the prospect of a nationwide scheme.

In late 2012, Liberal Youth Scotland stood up for students in Scotland by campaigned against SNP changes to university student support packages that, although an increase in up front funding, would result in a cut to bursaries of up to £1000 to the poorest students. This stance was adopted by the Scottish Liberal Democrats and Liberal Youth Scotland secured hundreds and hundreds of signatures in support of the campaign and the against the following SNP cuts to the College Sector.

In early 2013, before the elections of the new executive, Liberal Youth Scotland brought forward a motion on a Ban on Snaring at the Scottish Liberal Democrat Spring Conference and co-hosted a fringe event alongside the animal rights charity, OneKind. Through extensive lobbying, Liberal Youth Scotland successfully passed the motion and won Scottish Liberal Democrat support for this animal welfare issue.

2013–2014

2016–2017

At the 2017 AGM Liberal Youth Scotland changed its name to Scottish Young Liberals. In November 2017, the Scottish Young Liberal membership penned three separate policy motions to be voted on by the Scottish Liberal Democrat membership. These included a motion on gender-neutral school uniform, more powers for the Scottish Youth Parliament and the proposal of civic education in secondary schools. All three were passed and became party policy.

2018–2019

At the 2019 Scottish Liberal Democrats Federal Conference in Hamilton, South Lanarkshire, Scottish Young Liberals proposed their Trans Rights are Human Rights motion. The motion covered the Gender Recognition Act and ensuring that transphobic organisations are not given platforms in the media. This was passed by the conference overwhelmingly.

List of chairs

See also
Young Liberals
English Young Liberals
Welsh Young Liberals
Scottish Liberal Democrats

References

External links
 Official website
 YouTube channel
 Facebook
 Twitter

Organisation of the Liberal Democrats (UK)
Scottish Liberal Democrats
Liberals